The 1977–78 FIBA Korać Cup was the seventh edition of FIBA's new competition, running from 15 November 1977 to 21 April 1978. It was contested by 32 teams, five more than in the previous edition.

Partizan defeated Bosna in a Yugoslav civil final to become the competition's champion for first time. This title was the third consecutive in a row for a Yugoslav team.

Season teams

First round

|}

*İTÜ withdrew before the first leg, and Bosna received a forfeit (2–0) in both games.

Round of 16

Semi finals

|}

Final
21 March 1978, Sportska dvorana Borik, Banja Luka

|}

References
Linguasport 1977–78 FIBA Korać Cup
1977–78 FIBA Korać Cup

1977–78
1977–78 in European basketball